Patrick Joyce may refer to:
 Patrick Joyce (historian), British social historian
 Patrick Weston Joyce (1827–1914), Irish historian
 Patrick H. Joyce (1879–1946), American railroad executive
 Paddy Joyce (1923–2000), Irish actor
 Patrick Joyce (politician), American politician